A Slice of Life (also known as The Anatomy of Love) is a 1954 Italian comedy film directed by Alessandro Blasetti and Paul Paviot.

Plot

Mara
From a story by Vasco Pratolini, written by the author.

Vasco and Mara get to know in a restaurant, go to the cinema, and spent the evening intimately, fall in love. She tells him that, being short of money, will try to work the next morning in a brothel, but he convinces her to desist from this connection, to begin to live with him, who has a job as a teacher, even if their economic situation may be difficult.

The baby

Written by Alberto Moravia.
Young couple the suburbs of Rome are in financial trouble. She would like to work, but must take care of the child who has recently given birth. The two then set out, reluctantly, to leave the baby in a church, but the mother can not decide on the right place and finally the father has second thoughts.

Outdoor scene
From a story of Marino Moretti, written by Ennio Flaiano.

A man and a woman no longer young, fallen nobility, meet again by chance after many years as they are worded as film extras in a carriage in motion. During the scene must speak, not heard, a theme to their liking. The scene is repeated several times, and so was born the opportunity to confide things that I had said many years ago. Finally decide to get married and run away from the set at the edge of the carriage.

Other people's houses
From a story by Silvio D'Arzo.

The old priest of a small mountain village realizes that the old Zelinda has for some time sad and thoughtful. After much persuasion, can be confident that the poor thing has soul: he would like to end prematurely to his strenuous and monotonous life. Mind the sacedordote search animatedly distogliela this regard, slips off a cliff and save it Zelinda pulling it upward.

Don Conrad
Subject of Giuseppe Marotta, dialogues by Eduardo De Filippo.

Don Conrad, a driver of public transport, paying court to love many women, that because of defaults on work that is not forgiven by his superior Amedeo. During a bus ride, his young friend Lando says he is dissatisfied with her boyfriend Michael, and understand to be attracted to him.

The camera
By Age & Scarpelli.

A girl Sophia Loren, is left by photographers friends in a room where he set up a game where you can win a camera. A customer Totò, helps her win the coveted prize, then walks away with her from the room without paying, and asked her to pose for the camera test, until he confesses to be with her by the court. So they try, unsuccessfully, to take a picture together with the help of the self timer, which the machine is equipped. After several attempts, they decide to make taking the picture with help from a stranger passing by for the event, which, after having distracted the two making them pose, runs away with the camera.

Cast

Mara
Yves Montand: Vasco
Danièle Delorme: Mara

Il pupo
Lea Padovani: Maria
Marcello Mastroianni: marito di Maria

Scena all'aperto
Vittorio De Sica: cocchiere
Elisa Cegani: Lidia

Casa d'altri
Michel Simon: prete
Sylvie: Zelinda

Don Corradino
Vittorio De Sica: Don Corradino Scognamiglio
Eduardo De Filippo: Amedeo Stigliano
Maria Fiore: Nannì
Marilyn Buferd:
Turi Pandolfini

La macchina fotografica
Sophia Loren: ragazza
Totò: avventore
Mario Castellani: barista

Il bacio
Dany Robin
François Périer

Gli innamorati
Andrea Checchi
Alba Arnova

Scusi, ma...
Alberto Sordi
Enrico Viarisio

References

External links
 

1954 films
1954 comedy films
Italian comedy films
French comedy films
1950s Italian-language films
French black-and-white films
Films directed by Alessandro Blasetti
Films directed by Paul Paviot
Films with screenplays by Suso Cecchi d'Amico
Films with screenplays by Age & Scarpelli
Films scored by Alessandro Cicognini
Lux Film films
Italian black-and-white films
1950s Italian films
1950s French films